Results from Norwegian football (soccer) in the year 1906.

Cup

Semifinal

|colspan="3" style="background-color:#97DEFF"|8 September 1906

Final

Class A of local association leagues
The predecessor of a national league competition.

The champions qualify to the 1905 Norwegian cup (The exception being Nordenfjeldske, which was not yet a NFF member).

References

External links
RSSSF Football Archive

 
Seasons in Norwegian football